De amore (Latin "On Love") may refer to:

 De amore (Andreas Capellanus) (1186–1190)
 De amore by Marsilio Ficino (1484)

See also
D'Amore (disambiguation)
Amor (disambiguation)
Love